is a Japanese folk and jazz guitarist.

Selected discography
California Roll, Voss Records 1987
Starry Eyed 2000
Guitar by Guitar 2007

References

1947 births
Living people